The 1959 U.S. Open was the 59th U.S. Open, held June 11–14 at the Winged Foot Golf Club in Mamaroneck, New York, a suburb northeast of New York City. Billy Casper won the first of his two U.S. Open titles, a stroke ahead of runner-up Bob Rosburg on the West Course. It was the first of Casper's three major titles, which included the 1966 U.S. Open and the Masters in 1970.

This was the second of six U.S. Opens at Winged Foot's West Course; it previously hosted in 1929, then returned in 1974, 1984, 2006, and 2020. It also hosted the PGA Championship in 1997.

Course layout
{|class="wikitable" style="text-align:center"
!Hole!!1!!2!!3!!4!!5!!6!!7!!8!!9!!Out!!10!!11!!12!!13!!14!!15!!16!!17!!18!!In!!Total
|-
|Yards||442||415||217||435||524||324||167||438||468||3,430||196||382||540||212||376||417||452||444||424||3,443||6,873
|-
|Par||4||4||3||4||5||4||3||4||4||35||3||4||5||3||4||4||4||4||4||35||70'|}

Final round
Casper began the final round with a three-stroke lead over Ben Hogan, age 46, who struggled to a 76 and fell to 8th place. Rosburg made a run at Casper's lead when he holed out a bunker shot for birdie at 11 and made a  putt for another birdie at 12 to draw even with Casper. A three-putt at the 13th meant Rosburg had to birdie the last to force a Monday playoff. His approach shot fell on the front of the green,  short, and he two-putted to finish a stroke back. Casper's final round 74 was enough. The difference for Casper proved to be his putting; he needed only 114 putts over 72 holes with 31 one-putts and just  one three-putt.

This U.S. Open was the first to be played over four days; thunderstorms and heavy rain delayed third round play on Saturday morning and the final round was postponed to Sunday.
The final round at the U.S. Open was first scheduled for Sunday in 1965.

Charlie Sifford, the pioneering African-American golfer, played in his first major championship, two years before the PGA of America allowed African-Americans to play on the PGA Tour; he finished in 32nd place.

Amateur Jack Nicklaus, 19, played in his third straight U.S. Open but missed the cut for the second time with two rounds of 77. He would place second the following year in 1960 to Arnold Palmer and win the first of his four titles in 1962 in a playoff over Palmer. After 1959, Nicklaus made 25 consecutive cuts at the U.S. Open, through 1984, also at Winged Foot.

 Past champions in the field 
 Made the cut 

 Missed the cut 

Source:

Round summaries
First roundThursday, June 11, 1959Second roundFriday, June 12, 1959Third roundSaturday, June 13, 1959Final roundSunday, June 14, 1959''

Source:

References

External links
1959 U.S. Open
USGA Championship Database

U.S. Open (golf)
Golf in New York (state)
Mamaroneck, New York
U.S. Open
U.S. Open
U.S. Open